Nicholas of Tolentino, San Nicolas de Tolentino or San Nicolás de Tolentino may refer to:

Nicholas of Tolentino, a Christian saint from Italy

Not to be confused with Niccolò da Tolentino, an Italian condottiero, or Saint Nicholas of Myra, venerated in Bari, Italy in the Basilica di San Nicola

Places
 La Aldea de San Nicolás, a municipality in the Canary Islands
 San Nicolas, Ilocos Norte, a municipality in the Philippines
 San Nicolás Tolentino, a municipality in San Luis Potosí, Mexico
 San Nicolás Tolentino, Puebla, an ejido in Izúcar de Matamoros (municipality),  Puebla, Mexico

Churches
Basilica of San Nicola in Tolentino, Marche, Italy
San Nicola da Tolentino agli Orti Sallustiani, in Rome, Italy
Church of Tolentini, Venice (San Nicolò da Tolentino), in Venice, Italy 
Ermita de San Nicolas de Tolentino, a chapel in Makati, Philippines
San Nicolas de Tolentino Parish Church, a church in Ilocos Norte, Philippines
San Nicolas de Tolentino Parish Church, a Catholic church in Pampanga, Philippines
San Nicolas de Tolentino Parish Church, a church in Quezon City, Philippines
San Nicolas de Tolentino Parish Church in Balaoan, La Union, Philippines
San Nicolás Tolentino Temple and Ex-Monastery in Actopan, Hidalgo, Mexico

See also
 Church of San Nicolás (disambiguation)